Alternative Splicing Annotation Project (ASAP) in computational biology was a database for alternative splicing data maintained by the University of California from 2003 to 2013. The purpose of ASAP was to provide a source for data mining projects by consolidating the information generated by genomics and proteomics researchers.

See also
 AspicDB
 ECgene
 RNA splicing

References

External links
 https://web.archive.org/web/20120722045541/http://bioinformatics.ucla.edu/ASAP2/

Biological databases
Gene expression
RNA splicing